Air Vice-Marshal Arthur John Capel,  (11 December 1894 – 18 April 1979) was a senior Royal Air Force officer.

Military career
Having served in the British Army during the First World War in the Somerset Light Infantry and then Royal Flying Corps, Capel joined the Royal Air Force (RAF) on its creation in 1918. He was involved in Pink's War, the RAF's first independent operation that was an air-to-ground campaign in Waziristan, and for which he was awarded the Distinguished Service Order. He rose up the ranks, and served as Commandant of the School of Army Co-operation (1936–1938), Air Officer Commanding (AOC) No. 22 (Army Co-operation) Group (1940), and AOC No. 20 (Training) Group (1941). During the Second World War, he served in the United Kingdom, France and the Middle East.

Later career
After retiring from the RAF in 1945, Capel served as a magistrate and councillor in Somerset, and was High Sheriff of Somerset for 1952.

References

External links
 , with image

1894 births
1979 deaths
British Army personnel of World War I
British World War I pilots
Companions of the Order of the Bath
Companions of the Distinguished Service Order
Deputy Lieutenants of Somerset
High Sheriffs of Somerset
Recipients of the Distinguished Flying Cross (United Kingdom)
Royal Air Force air marshals of World War II
Royal Flying Corps officers
Somerset Light Infantry officers